Elena Dementieva and Lina Krasnoroutskaia were the defending champions, but Dementieva chose not to take part in 2004. Krasnoroutskaia paired up with Anca Barna, but lost in the first round.

Lisa McShea and Milagros Sequera won the title in 2004.

Results

Seeds

  Barbara Schett /  Patty Schnyder (semifinals)
  Lisa McShea /  Milagros Sequera (champions)
  Tina Krizan /  Katarina Srebotnik (first round)
  Caroline Dhenin /  Jennifer Russell (quarterfinals)

Draw

References

Rosmalen Grass Court Championships
2004 WTA Tour